Judson W. Sherman (1808November 12, 1881) was a U.S. Representative from New York.

Early life and career
Judson W. Sherman was born in New York State in 1808.  He completed a preparatory education, and settled in Angelica, New York.

Sherman became involved in politics and government, first as a Democratic republican, and later as a Whig. He attended several state and county conventions as a delegate, and held several local offices in Angelica. From 1831 to 1837 he served Allegany County Clerk. In addition, he later served as Deputy New York State Treasurer in the 1850s. He ran unsuccessfully for the U.S. House of Representatives in 1842 and 1852.

Sherman was elected as a Republican to the Thirty-fifth Congress and served one term (March 4, 1857 – March 3, 1859).

Military service
In September 1861 Sherman joined the Union Army for the American Civil War, receiving appointment as a commissary of subsistence officer with the rank of captain and serving until resigning his commission on November 9, 1861.

Death and burial
Sherman died in Angelica, New York on November 12, 1881. He was interred at Until the Day Dawn Cemetery in Angelica.

Sources

External links

 

1808 births
1881 deaths
United States Army officers
Republican Party members of the United States House of Representatives from New York (state)
People from Angelica, New York
19th-century American politicians